Breakfast of Champions is a 1999 American satirical black comedy film adapted and directed by Alan Rudolph, from  Kurt Vonnegut, Jr.'s 1973 novel of the same name. Though the producers entered it into the 49th Berlin International Film Festival, the film was panned by critics and was a box office bomb that was withdrawn from theatres before going into wide release. It has not yet been given a digital release.

Plot
Dwayne Hoover, a car salesman who is the most respected businessman in Midland City, Indiana, is on the verge of a nervous breakdown, even attempting suicide daily. His wife, Celia, is addicted to pills, and his sales manager and best friend, Harry Le Sabre, is preoccupied with his own secret fondness for wearing lingerie, worried he will be discovered.

Meanwhile, a little-known science fiction author, Kilgore Trout, is hitchhiking across the United States to speak at Midland City's arts festival. In search of answers for his identity quest, Hoover decides to attend the festival.

Cast

 Bruce Willis as Dwayne Hoover
 Albert Finney as Kilgore Trout
 Nick Nolte as Harry LeSabre
 Barbara Hershey as Celia Hoover
 Glenne Headly as Francine Pefko
 Lukas Haas as George "Bunny" Hoover
 Omar Epps as Wayne Hoobler
 Vicki Lewis as Grace LeSabre
 Buck Henry as Fred T. Barry
 Ken Campbell as Eliot Rosewater / Gilbert
 Jake Johanssen as Bill Bailey
 Will Patton as Moe the truck driver
 Chip Zien as Andy Wojeckowzski
 Owen Wilson as Monte Rapid
 Alison Eastwood as Maria Maritimo
 Shawnee Smith as Bonnie McMahon
 Michael Jai White as Howell
 Michael Duncan as Eli
 Kurt Vonnegut, Jr. as Commercial director
 Doug Maughan (voice) as TV/radio announcer (uncredited)

Production
Lukas Haas makes a cameo as Bunny, Dwayne's son, who, in the novel, plays piano in the lounge at the Holiday Inn. For legal reasons, in the film Bunny instead plays at the AmeriTel Inn.

The film's soundtrack predominantly features the exotica recordings of Martin Denny to tie in with Hoover's Hawaiian-based sales promotion.

Much of the film was shot in and around Twin Falls, Idaho. Kurt Vonnegut makes a one-line cameo as a TV commercial director.

Reception

Box office
The film made $178,278 against a budget of $12 million.

Critical response
Breakfast of Champions received negative reviews, scoring a rating of 26% on Rotten Tomatoes based on 47 reviews, with an average score of 4.23/10. The consensus states: "The movie is overwhelmed by its chaotic visual effects and disjointed storyline." In his review for The New York Times, Stephen Holden wrote "In many ways, Breakfast of Champions is an incoherent mess. But it never compromises its zany vision of the country as a demented junkyard wonderland in which we are all strangers groping for a hand to guide us through the looking glass into an unsullied tropical paradise of eternal bliss." Entertainment Weekly gave the film an "F" rating and Owen Gleiberman wrote "Rudolph, in an act of insane folly, seems to think that what matters is the story. The result could almost be his version of a Robert Altman disaster — a movie so unhinged it practically dares you not to hate it."

In his review for the San Francisco Chronicle, Peter Stack wrote "Rudolph botches the material big time. Relying on lame visual gimmicks that fall flat, and insisting on pushing almost every scene as frantic comedy weighted by social commentary, he forces his actors to become hams rather than believable characters." Sight and Sound magazine's Edward Lawrenson wrote "Willis' performance, all madness, no method, soon feels embarrassingly indulgent." In his review for the Los Angeles Times, Kevin Thomas wrote "As it is, Breakfast of Champions is too in-your-face, too heavily satirical in its look, and its ideas not as fresh as they should be. For the film to have grabbed us from the start, Rudolph needed to make a sharper differentiation between the everyday world his people live in and the vivid world of their tormented imaginations."

In her review for the Village Voice, Amy Taubin wrote "Another middle-aged male-crisis opus, it begins on a note of total migraine-inducing hysteria, which continues unabated throughout." The French filmmaker and critic Luc Moullet, on the other hand, regarded it as one of the great films of the 1990s.

Vonnegut's reaction
At the close of the Harper Audiobook edition of Breakfast of Champions, there is a brief conversation between Vonnegut and his long-time friend and attorney Donald C. Farber, in which the two, among making jokes, disparage this loose film adaptation of the book as "painful to watch."

See also
 Cross-dressing in film and television
 Kilgore Trout

References

External links
 
 
 
 

1999 films
1990s black comedy films
American black comedy films
American satirical films
Cross-dressing in American films
1990s English-language films
Films about writers
Films based on works by Kurt Vonnegut
Films directed by Alan Rudolph
Films set in Idaho
Films shot in Idaho
Hollywood Pictures films
Summit Entertainment films
American independent films
Twin Falls, Idaho
Films scored by Mark Isham
Films about car dealerships
Films based on American novels
1999 comedy films
1990s satirical films
1990s American films